A personal FM transmitter is a low-power FM radio transmitter that broadcasts a signal from a portable audio device (such as an MP3 player) to a standard FM radio. Most of these transmitters plug into the device's headphone jack and then broadcast the signal over an FM broadcast band frequency, so that it can be picked up by any nearby radio. This allows portable audio devices to make use of the louder or better sound quality of a home audio system or car stereo without requiring a wired connection. They are often used in cars but may also be in fixed locations such as broadcasting from a computer sound card throughout a building.

Typically they broadcast on any FM frequency from 87.5 to 108.0 MHz in most of the world, 76.0 - 95.0 MHz for Japan, 65.0 - 74.2 MHz for Russia, and 88.1 to 107.9 MHz in the US and Canada.

Uses 
Personal FM transmitters are commonly used as a workaround for playing portable audio devices on car radios that don't have an Auxiliary "AUX" input jack or Bluetooth audio connectivity. They are also used to broadcast a stationary audio source, like a computer or a television, around a home. They can also be used for low-power broadcasting and pirate radio but only to a very limited audience in near proximity. They can also be used as a "talking sign" in real estate sales or similar. Devices can be operated by connecting to the audio source or to a proprietary port of a specific device it is made for. In addition, certain devices such as hands-free car kits, navigation tools such as the TomTom GO, mobile phones like some Nokia Nseries models, and MP3 players may have FM transmitters built-in, however this has become uncommon.

Legality 
The legality and maximum permitted power levels or field strengths of these devices varies by country. In 2006 these devices became legal in most countries in the European Union.

In the UK Statutory Instrument IR2030/26/2 2011/0401/UK (from December 2011) permits unlicensed use of devices that can be shown to radiate less than 50 nanowatts (-43dBm), on a 0.2 MHz raster in the range 87.5–108 MHz.

In the United States, Part 15 of the U.S. Federal Communications Commission rules specifies that no license is needed if range of the transmitter does not exceed .

In Japan, no license is needed for devices with a signal strength of less than 500 µV/m at 3 meters.

See also
Car audio
FM broadcasting
Frequency modulation
Microbroadcasting
Part 15 of the FCC rules regarding unlicensed broadcasting
Pirate radio
Portable audio player

References

External links 
 Frequently Asked Questions on Low-Power FM Broadcasting from Industry Canada
 Micro-Broadcasting: Getting The Most Out Of Part 15 Radio originally published by Monitoring Times, Sept. 2011
 Understanding the FCC Regulations for Low-Power, Non-Licensed Transmitters at the FCC. (USA)

IPod accessories
Consumer electronics
Digital audio players
Wireless transmitters
Radio hobbies
Repurposing